James M. O'Brien (born November 7, 1951) is an American former professional basketball player. O'Brien played college basketball at the University of Maryland and at the time he left Maryland he was the team's 6th all-time leading scorer.  O'Brien was selected in both the 1973 ABA draft and 1973 NBA draft. The Indiana Pacers, then of the ABA, selected him in the third round, while the Cleveland Cavaliers chose him in NBA's third draft round as well.

The New York Nets acquired O'Brien's ABA rights from Indiana in June 1973 and signed him to a one-year guaranteed contract for $100,000.  He was cut by the Nets in training camp as Nets' coach Kevin Loughery felt he was too heavy and too slow.  He played semi-pro ball for Trenton in the Eastern League for a few months while getting paid by and practicing with the Nets.  He was brought back to the  Nets in January 1974 while a few Nets' players were injured and Loughery stated at the time that O'Brien was in much better condition than he was during training camp.   He won the ABA championship in 1973–74 with the Nets.  During the 1974 playoffs he only played in 4 games for a total of less than 10 minutes.  In the finals he only played in 1 game for 3 minutes but scored 8 points in that short time.

The Nets cut O'Brien during 1974 training camp and he was signed by the Memphis Sounds.  O'Brien said of being cut by the Nets that: 
I had the feeling I was going to be cut in camp.  I thought it was between Al Skinner and me but when Ed Manning arrived and got the playing time I knew I was gone.  I didn't panic though.  I thought there was a place for me and I am very happy here in Memphis.  I'm getting the playing time and I don't care if it's at guard or forward.

The Sounds folded after the 1974-75 season and O'Brien signed with the Cavaliers of the NBA, despite having an option year left on his ABA contract.  O'Brien was waived by the Cavaliers before the 1975-76 season started.

References

1951 births
Living people
American men's basketball players
Basketball players from Virginia
Cleveland Cavaliers draft picks
Indiana Pacers draft picks
Maryland Terrapins men's basketball players
Memphis Sounds players
New York Nets players
People from Falls Church, Virginia
Small forwards
Guards (basketball)